Çakrak is a village of Alucra district of Giresun Province of Turkey.
It has a (2000) population of 171.

Villages in Alucra District